Zwiesel Mountain is a large complex mountain which is highly dissected, rising to 2,970 m and forming the north portion of Pieck Range in the Petermann Ranges of Queen Maud Land. It was discovered and given the descriptive name "Zwiesel-Berg" (forked mountain) by the Third German Antarctic Expedition (1938–1939), led by Capt. Alfred Ritscher.

See also
 Bremotet Moraine
 List of mountains of Queen Maud Land
 Sandbotnen Cirque

References

External links

Mountains of Queen Maud Land
Princess Astrid Coast